Nurcholish Madjid (March 17, 1939 – August 29, 2005), in Indonesia affectionately known as Cak Nur, was a prominent Indonesian Muslim intellectual. Early in his academic career, Nurcholish was a leader in various student organizations. He soon became well known as a proponent for modernization within Islam. Throughout his career he continued to argue that for Islam to be victorious in the global struggle of ideas, it needs to embrace the concepts of tolerance, democracy and pluralism.

Biography

Born in Jombang, East Java, Madjid received his early education in religious institutions in Indonesia, so called pesantren. He later received his doctorate in Islamic Studies from the University of Chicago in the United States where he studied under the noted Pakistani-American scholar, Fazlur Rahman. In 2003 he participated in Indonesia's national elections as a candidate for the presidency. He served as Rector of Paramadina University in Jakarta from 1998 up until his death. Madjid was married and had two children.

In the 1970s, Cak Nur coined the slogan: 'Islam Yes, Islamic Party No',  which became very popular. The slogan helped combat the view that it was sinful for Muslims to vote against Islamic parties. The two most successful Muslim parties in Indonesia's 2004 general elections, the moderate National Awakening and United Development Parties, received 10.6% and 8.1% of the vote, respectively.

Publications
“The Issue of Modernization among Muslims in Indonesia: A Participant’s Point of View”, in: Gloria Davies, ed. What is Modern in Indonesian Culture, Athens, Ohio, Ohio University, 1978
Islam in Indonesia: Challenges and Opportunities, in: Cyriac K. Pullapilly, ed., Islam in the Modern World, Bloomington, Indiana: Crossroads, 1982
“The Necessity of Renewing Islamic Thought and Reinvigorating Religious Understanding”, in: Charles Kurzman, ed. Liberal Islam: A Sourcebook, New York: Oxford University Press, 1988
“In Search of Islamic Roots for Modern Pluralism: The Indonesian Experiences” in: Mark Woodward ed, Towards a New Paradigm, Recent Developments in Indonesian Islamic Thought, Tempe, Arizona, Arizona State University, 1996

References
 Abdullah Saeed (1997) “Ijtihād and Innovation in Neo-Modernist Islamic Thought in Indonesia”, Islam and Christian-Muslim Relations, Vol. 8, No. 3, 1997, p. 279-295
 Greg Barton (1997) Indonesia's Nurcholish Madjid and Abdurrahman Wahid as intellectual Ulama: The meeting of Islamic traditionalism and modernism in neo‐modernist thought, Islam and Christian-Muslim Relations, Vol. 8, No. 3, 1997, p.  323-350.
 Ensiklopedia Nurcholis Madjid, Budhy Munawar-Rachman, Feb 2007.

Notes

External links
 Nurcholis Madjid and the Paramadina Foundation(pdf-file)
 Universitas Paramadina
 Obituary in The New York Times

1939 births
2005 deaths
People from Jombang Regency
Javanese people
University of Chicago alumni
Indonesian Muslims
20th-century Muslim scholars of Islam
Indonesian Muslim scholars of Islam
Muslim reformers

fr:Madjid